Other missions bearing the name San Juan Bautista include the Mission San Juan Bautista in California and the Misión San Juan Bautista in Coahuila

History
San Juan Bautista mission had the objective of evangelizing the local Monqui Native Americans (Indians), but the mission soon ran into difficulty.  The numbers of the Monqui, who called their rancheria at the site Ligui, rapidly diminished, possibly due to European diseases.  They were replaced by a few dozen Cochimí people who knew the site as Malibat.  The more intractable Pericúes lived on nearby islands and sometimes raided the mission and its stores.  The mission lost its funding from a wealthy benefactor, water at the site was insufficient for agriculture, and at some seasons the residents had to depart the mission to search for water to drink.

Ugarte left the mission because of ill health in 1709, and, thereafter, a Jesuit missionary was not always present. The mission was closed in 1721 when the remaining Christian Indians were moved to the new mission of Dolores in the territory of the Guaycura Indians south of San Juan Bautista. Surviving archaeological remnants of the abandoned mission include several sections of building foundations.

See also

 List of Jesuit sites

References

Further reading
 Vernon, Edward W. 2002. Las Misiones Antiguas: The Spanish Missions of Baja California, 1683–1855. Viejo Press, Santa Barbara, California.

Missions in Baja California Sur
Loreto Municipality (Baja California Sur)
1705 establishments in New Spain